Whitney Sloan (born 21 August 1988 in London) is a British actress known for the role of "Hollywood Henderson" in the Disney Channel Original Movie Go Figure. She has appeared in stage productions of West Side Story, 'Fiddler on the Roof', and Romeo and Juliet. Television roles include Judging Amy, General Hospital, and the independent film State's Evidence. She appeared in the films  Blue Demon and Glass Trap and starred in a school production of Lilian Hellman's The Children's Hour. Recent projects include Go Figure and Joint Custody.

Filmography

External links

1988 births
Living people
British television actresses
Actresses from London
21st-century British actresses
21st-century English women
21st-century English people